The 2021 Amex-Istanbul Challenger was a professional tennis tournament played on hard courts. It was the 34th edition of the tournament which was part of the 2021 ATP Challenger Tour. It took place in Istanbul, Turkey between 18 and 24 January 2021.

Singles main-draw entrants

Seeds

 1 Rankings are as of 11 January 2021.

Other entrants
The following players received wildcards into the singles main draw: 
  Altuğ Çelikbilek
  Cem İlkel
  Ergi Kırkın

The following players received entry from the qualifying draw:
  Jay Clarke
  João Menezes
  Arthur Rinderknech
  Lukáš Rosol

The following player received entry as a lucky loser:
  Denis Istomin

Champions

Singles

 Arthur Rinderknech def.  Benjamin Bonzi 4–6, 7–6(7–1), 7–6(7–3).

Doubles

 André Göransson /  David Pel def.  Lloyd Glasspool /  Harri Heliövaara 4–6, 6–3, [10–8].

References

2021 ATP Challenger Tour
2021
January 2021 sports events in Turkey
2021 in Turkish tennis